Soul Men is a 2008 American musical comedy film directed by Malcolm D. Lee, and starring Samuel L. Jackson, Bernie Mac, Sharon Leal and Sean Hayes, released on November 7, 2008. It was one of three Bernie Mac films that were released after his death (and was actually released on the same date as another posthumous film, Madagascar: Escape 2 Africa).

Bernie Mac and Isaac Hayes died in unrelated circumstances on August 9 and 10, 2008, respectively.  Director Lee said the film was heavily re-edited to soften the tone of the film, as a tribute to the two actors.

It is the last Weinstein Company film to be distributed by Metro-Goldwyn-Mayer.

Plot

Two former backup soul singers, Louis Hinds and Floyd Henderson, who have not spoken to each other in 30 years since their band ended, reluctantly agree to travel across the country together for a reunion concert to honor their recently deceased band member and lead singer, Marcus Hooks.

Cast

Samuel L. Jackson as Louis Hinds
Bernie Mac as Floyd Henderson
Sharon Leal as Cleo Whitfield
Sean Hayes as Danny Epstein
Affion Crockett as Lester "The Court Jester"
Adam Herschman as Phillip
Fatso-Fasano as Pay-Pay
Jackie Long as Zig-Zag
John Legend as Marcus Hooks
Jennifer Coolidge as Rosalee
Isaac Hayes as himself
Mike Epps as Duane Henderson
Millie Jackson as Floyd's ex Claudette
Sara Erikson as Chastity
Vanessa del Rio as Full Figured Neighbor
Randy Jackson as The Narrator (voice)

Production

Music
The score for the film was composed by Stanley Clarke. The song, "I'm Your Puppet" , which serves as the fictional trio's 1969 hit single, was actually a hit for James & Bobby Purify in 1966. The official soundtrack was released November 4, 2008 by Stax Records, and features music by John Legend, Isaac Hayes, Sharon Jones and the Dap Kings, and others.

Reception

Soul Men received generally mixed reviews from film critics. Based on 98 reviews, Rotten Tomatoes reported that 46% of critics gave the film a positive review stating that "Soul Men features lively performances from Bernie Mac and Samuel L. Jackson, and some hilarious moments, but ultimately suffers from an unoriginal script." Metacritic, another review aggregator, reported that critics gave the film an average score of 49/100, based on 23 reviews.

The film opened at #6 with $5,000,000 behind Zack and Miri Make a Porno, Changeling, High School Musical 3: Senior Year, Role Models, and Madagascar: Escape 2 Africa (which, coincidentally, 
Mac was also in; both films are dedicated in his memory). At the conclusion of its domestic theatrical run on February 5, 2009, the film's gross was $12,082,391.

Director Malcolm D. Lee said the movie was a failure because "nobody gave a shit about two old R&B singers."

Home media
The film was released on DVD on February 10, 2009 and by the 5th week, about 483,360 units have been sold, bringing in $9,443,721 in revenue. This does not include Blu-ray Disc sales.

References

External links

 

2008 films
2000s musical comedy films
American musical comedy films
Dimension Films films
Metro-Goldwyn-Mayer films
The Weinstein Company films
2000s English-language films
Films scored by Stanley Clarke
Films about singers
Films directed by Malcolm D. Lee
Films set in Manhattan
Films set in Memphis, Tennessee
Films set in 2008
2000s road movies
American road movies
African-American comedy films
2008 comedy films
2000s American films